Abok may refer to:

Places
Abok, Mon State, a village in south-east Burma in Mon State, Burma
Abok, Shan State, a village in north-east Burma in Shan State, Burma
Abok, Malaysia, a small town in Sarawak, Malaysia

Other uses
The Ashley Book of Knots